Hepatozoon massardii is a species of alveolates known to infect snake species such as Crotalus durissus terrificus (rattlesnake).

References

Conoidasida
Parasites of reptiles